Glenellrig railway station served the village of Slamannan, Falkirk, Scotland, from 1848 to 1850 on the Slamannan Railway.

History 
The station was opened in July 1848 by the Slamannan Railway. It was a short lived station, closing on 1 January 1850.

References

External links 

Disused railway stations in Falkirk (council area)
Railway stations in Great Britain opened in 1848
Railway stations in Great Britain closed in 1850
1848 establishments in Scotland
1850 disestablishments in Scotland